Events in the year 1669 in Norway.

Incumbents
Monarch: Frederick III

Arts and literature

Rennebu Church was built.

Deaths
9 March – Isak Lauritssøn Falck, merchant (born 1601).

See also

References